The Mitchell Site, designated by the Smithsonian trinomial 39DV2, is an important archaeological site in Mitchell, Davison County, South Dakota.  It was declared a National Historic Landmark in 1964.  At that time it was the only reliably dated site of the Lower James River Phase (Initial Variant).  The site, sheltered under a dome, is managed by a nonprofit organization and is open to the public as Mitchell Prehistoric Indian Village.  Visitors can watch archaeologists uncover artifacts in the Thomsen Center Archeodome.  The Boehnen Memorial Museum features a reconstructed lodge and many of the artifacts found at the site.

Description
The Mitchell Site is located north of downtown Mitchell, on the east side of Indian Village Road, on a point overlooking Lake Mitchell.  The site contains what was once a village made of lodges surrounded by a ditch and timber palisade.

The people who once lived on the Mitchell site acquired their food from many different sources. The discovery of food processing tools and carbonized seeds suggest that these people were growing much of their food. Artifacts, such as hoes and squash knives are also good indicators that they were farmers. Various types of carbonized seeds and corn cobs show they were growing corn, beans, squash,  sunflowers and tobacco.

Archaeological history
The site was first recorded archaeologically in 1922, when it was described as including 45 earth lodge sites, extending northward on a spur of land overlooking Firesteel Creek.  The creek has since been dammed to form Lake Mitchell, and the area south of the surviving site elements has been landscaped as part of a golf course.  The latter work in particular has compromised the ditches that originally surrounded the settlement.  Two house depressions were excavated in 1938 by a crew funded by the Works Progress Administration.  A house excavated in 1971 showed evidence of having been destroyed by fire, but included remarkable detail on its architecture.

In 1975 a nonprofit organization was founded to continue archaeological work and to preserve the site.

See also
List of National Historic Landmarks in South Dakota
National Register of Historic Places listings in Davison County, South Dakota

References

External links

Mitchell Prehistoric Indian Village - official site

Archaeological sites on the National Register of Historic Places in South Dakota
Geography of Davison County, South Dakota
National Historic Landmarks in South Dakota
Museums in Davison County, South Dakota
Archaeological museums in South Dakota
National Register of Historic Places in Davison County, South Dakota